Falsimargarita georgiana is a species of sea snail, a marine gastropod mollusk in the family Calliostomatidae.

Description
The size of the shell varies between 20 mm and 31 mm. It has a rounded whorl profile and a uniform spiral sculpture.

Distribution
This marine species occurs off the South Georgia Islands at depths between 2718 m and 2818 m.

References

 Dell, R. K. (1990). Antarctic Mollusca with special reference to the fauna of the Ross Sea. Bulletin of the Royal Society of New Zealand, Wellington 27: 1–311 page(s): 95

External links
 

georgiana
Gastropods described in 1990
Molluscs of the Atlantic Ocean